The 2007 Polish Figure Skating Championships were held in two parts:
 Senior, junior synchronized, and novice competitions were held in Oświęcim between December 14 and 17, 2006.
 Senior ice dancing and junior competitions were held at the Torwar in Warszawa between January 5 and 7, 2007.

The competition in Warszawa was the last trial before the 2007 European Championships.

Senior results

Men

Judges were:
 Referee: Halina Gordon-Półtorak
 Technical Controller: Anna Sierocka
 Technical Specialist: Sarkis Tewanian
 Assistant Technical Specialist: Anna Firych
 Judge No. 1: Danuta Dubrowko
 Judge No. 2: Aniela Hebel-Szmak
 Judge No. 3: Agata Wasilewska
 Judge No. 4: Maria Olesińska
 Judge No. 5: Joanna Szczerba

Ladies

Judges were:
 Referee: Halina Gordon-Półtorak
 Technical Controller: Anna Sierocka
 Technical Specialist: Sarkis Tewanian
 Assistant Technical Specialist: Joanna Szczerba
 Judge No. 1: Magdalena Seredyńska
 Judge No. 2: Angelika Rzeczkowska-Drab
 Judge No. 3: Małgorzata Sobkow
 Judge No. 4: Olga Pałasz
 Judge No. 5: Ewa Lachowicz

Pairs

Judges were:
 Referee: Aniela Hebel-Szmak
 Technical Controller: Anna Sierocka
 Technical Specialist: Joanna Szczerba
 Assistant Technical Specialist: Olga Palasz
 Judge No. 1: Angelika Rzeczkowska-Drab
 Judge No. 2: Maria Olesińska
 Judge No. 3: Agata Blachut-Stoczek
 Judge No. 4: Anna Firych
 Judge No. 5: Danuta Dubrowko

Ice dancing

Judges were:
 Referee: Maria Miller
 Technical Controller: Halina Gordon-Półtorak
 Technical Specialist: Daria Ryciak
 Judge No. 1: Danuta Dubrowko
 Judge No. 2: Tomasz Politański
 Judge No. 3: Małgorzata Sobków
 Judge No. 4: Marcin Kozubek
 Judge No. 5: Andrzej Józefowicz

Junior results

Men

Judges were:
 Referee: Halina Gordon-Półtorak
 Technical Controller: Anna Sierocka
 Technical Specialist: Joanna Szczerba
 Assistant Technical Specialist: Anna Firych
 Judge No. 1: Danuta Dubrowko
 Judge No. 2: Magdalena Seredyńska
 Judge No. 3: Andrzej Józefowicz
 Judge No. 4: Agata Wasilewska
 Judge No. 5: Olga Pałasz

Ladies

Judges were:
 Referee: Hanna Then
 Technical Controller: Halina Gordon-Półtorak
 Technical Specialist: Joanna Szczerba
 Assistant Technical Specialist: Olga Pałasz
 Judge No. 1: Magdalena Seredyńska
 Judge No. 2: Andżelika Rzeczkowska-Drab
 Judge No. 3: Jacek Grzegrzółka
 Judge No. 4: Małgorzata Sobków
 Judge No. 5: Agata Wasilewska

Pairs

Judges were:
 Referee: Hanna Then
 Technical Controller: Anna Sierocka
 Technical Specialist: Anna Firych
 Assistant Technical Specialist: Joanna Szczerba
 Judge No. 1: Jacek Grzegrzółka
 Judge No. 2: Malgorzata Sobków
 Judge No. 3: Maria Miller
 Judge No. 4: Olga Palasz
 Judge No. 5: Halina Gordon-Półtorak

Ice dancing

Judges were:
 Referee: Maria Miller
 Technical Controller: Halina Gordon-Półtorak
 Technical Specialist: Daria Ryciak
 Judge No. 1: Danuta Dubrowko
 Judge No. 2: Tomasz Politański
 Judge No. 3: Małgorzata Sobkow
 Judge No. 4: Marcin Kozubek
 Judge No. 5: Andrzej Józefowicz

Synchronized

Judges were:
 Referee: Danuta Dubrowko
 Technical Controller: Joanna Szczerba
 Technical Specialist: Daria Ryciak
 Judge No. 1: Magdalena Seredyńska
 Judge No. 2: Andrzej Józefowicz
 Judge No. 3: Marcin Kozubek
 Judge No. 4: Tomasz Politański

Novice results

Men

Judges were:
 Referee: Aniela Hebel-Szmak
 Technical Controller: Ryszard Kiewrel
 Technical Specialist: Anna Firych
 Assistant Technical Specialist: Olga Palasz
 Judge No. 1: Maria Olesińska
 Judge No. 2: Jan Wikłacz
 Judge No. 3: Małgorzata Sobków
 Judge No. 4: Andrzej Józefowicz
 Judge No. 5: Danuta Dubrowko

Ladies

Judges were:
 Referee: Hanna Then
 Technical Controller: Ryszard Kiewrel
 Technical Specialist: Olga Palasz
 Assistant Technical Specialist: Anna Firych
 Judge No. 1: Magdalena Seredyńska
 Judge No. 2: Agata Wasilewska
 Judge No. 3: Ewa Lachowicz
 Judge No. 4: Agata Blachut-Stoczek
 Judge No. 5: Joanna Szczerba

Pairs

Judges were:
 Referee: Hanna Then
 Technical Controller: Ryszard Kiewrel
 Technical Specialist: Olga Pałasz
 Assistant Technical Specialist: Joanna Szczerba
 Judge No. 1: Agata Wasilewska
 Judge No. 2: Danuta Dubrowko
 Judge No. 3: Angelika Rzeczkowska-Drab
 Judge No. 4: Agata Blachut-Stoczek
 Judge No. 5: Maria Olesińska

Ice dancing

Judges were:
 Referee: Małgorzata Sobkow
 Technical Controller: Halina Gordon-Półtorak
 Technical Specialist: Daria Ryciak
 Judge No. 1: Danuta Dubrowko
 Judge No. 2: Andrzej Józefowicz
 Judge No. 3: Tomasz Politański
 Judge No. 4: Marcin Kozubek

External links
 Senior, junior synchronized, and novice results at the Polish Figure Skating Association
 Senior ice dancing and junior results at the Polish Figure Skating Association

Polish Figure Skating Championships
2006 in figure skating
Polish Figure Skating Championships, 2007
2006 in Polish sport
Polish Figure Skating Championships, 2007